Carollo Engineers is an environmental engineering firm specializing in the planning, design, and construction management of water and wastewater facilities for municipal and public sector clients in the United States. The firm is headquartered in Walnut Creek, California, and currently maintains 38 offices throughout the United States. Carollo has provided services to the City of Phoenix for over 80 years and to Southern California's Orange County Sanitation District for over 50 years.

Carollo Engineers employs civil, structural, electrical, mechanical, environmental, and instrumentation and control engineers, as well as scientists, planners, architects, and CAD designers. Carollo offers water supply, treatment, and distribution engineering services; watershed and water resources planning; storm water and urban wet weather planning, permitting, and regulatory assistance; computer modeling, master planning, decision support analysis, and financial assistance services; and reuse studies. Carollo is also involved in planning and design of biogas cogeneration and standby power facilities for the water and wastewater industry; provides utility finance, business planning, asset management, infrastructure engineering, and water reclamation/reuse services; and provides program/construction management services for public work facilities and industrial and private structures.

The company’s projects include pilot and treatment studies, pump stations, pipelines, solids handling facilities, and reservoirs. It serves public agencies, private developers, and industrial firms. Carollo has offices in Los Angeles, San Francisco, San Diego, Pasadena, Sacramento, Walnut Creek, Fresno, Bakersfield, Fountain Valley, and Riverside, California; Las Vegas and Reno, Nevada; Phoenix and Yuma, Arizona; Portland, Oregon; Seattle, Washington; Boise, Idaho; Salt Lake City, Utah; Broomfield and Littleton, Colorado; Kansas City, Missouri; Chicago, Illinois; Oklahoma City, Oklahoma; Charlotte, North Carolina; Dallas, Houston, Fort Worth, and Austin, Texas; Boston, Massachusetts; and Miami, Tampa, Orlando, Sarasota, Palm Beach, and Hollywood, Florida.

Carollo Engineers is a Regional Sponsor for Water For People, which helps developing countries improve their quality of life by supporting the development of locally sustainable drinking water resources, sanitation facilities, and health and hygiene education programs.

History
John Carollo joined Sam Headman and Ben Ferguson in setting up the engineering firm of Headman, Ferguson, and Carollo in downtown Phoenix in 1933. In 1957, after Sam Headman died and Ben Ferguson retired and sold his interest to John Carollo, the firm became John A. Carollo, Consulting Engineers. The corporation's name was later changed to Carollo Engineers.

During the course of Carollo's history, the firm has completed more than 15,000 engineering projects for the public sector and now employs over 1,000 employees. Carollo is currently ranked within Engineering News Record's (ENR) top 100 design firms, and is ranked 13 overall for design firms in sewage and solid waste. Almost half of the employees are Registered Professional Engineers and Carollo Engineers is a Registered Professional Corporation. In 2016, Carollo was named California's Design Firm of the Year by ENR California.

In 1998, the company converted from a partnership to an S-Corporation.  In 2001, the company merged with Denver-based Morroni Engineering, Inc. to further expand its reach into the electrical, instrumentation, and control fields.  In early 2007, Carollo Engineers created a new logo and trademarked the tag line "Engineers...Working Wonders With Water".

References

External links
Official Web Site

Engineering consulting firms of the United States
Engineering companies of the United States
Construction and civil engineering companies established in 1933
Companies based in California
Privately held companies based in Arizona
1933 establishments in Arizona